Ingjerd Hanevold (born 30 March 1955) is a  Norwegian designer of jewellery, born in Asker. Among her works is the design of the Olympic medals for the 1994 Winter Olympics. She was appointed professor at the Oslo National Academy of the Arts from 1998.

References

1955 births
Living people
People from Asker
Academic staff of the Oslo National Academy of the Arts
Norwegian women academics